Thornton le Moor may refer to multiple English villages:

 Thornton le Moor, Lincolnshire
 Thornton-le-Moor, North Yorkshire

See also 
 Thornton-le-Moors for the similarly named Cheshire village